The Argentine general election of 1983 was held on 30 October and marked the return of constitutional rule following the self-styled National Reorganization Process dictatorship installed in 1976. Voters fully chose the president, governors, mayors, and their respective national, province and town legislators; with a turnout of 85.6%.

Background
In 1976 the military announced a coup d'état against President Isabel Perón with problems of financial instability, inflation, endemic corruption, international isolation and violence that typified her last year in office. Many citizens believed the National Reorganization Process, the junta's government, would improve the general state of Argentina. As that regime's third dictator, General Leopoldo Galtieri, awoke in the early hours of June 18, 1982, to find a letter requesting he resign, however, he had no doubt that the Process had run its course. Against the wishes of Galtieri's commanders, the Joint Chiefs chose Army General Reynaldo Bignone not so much the new President as the usher towards a democratic transition, which President Bignone announced would take place in March 1984. Inheriting an economy struggling under crushing interest rates imposed by the Central Bank Circular 1050, Bignone's new president of the institution, Domingo Cavallo, rescinded the policy in July, a move towards economic liberalization complemented by Bignone's restoring a limited right of assembly and free speech. Argentina's wide array of political parties, jointly pressing for elections through a "Multiparty" convened by centrist UCR leader Ricardo Balbín in 1981, geared for the imminent return to democracy.

Six years of intermittent wage freezes, policies adverse to industry and restrictive measures like the Circular 1050 had left GDP per capita at its lowest level since 1968 and real wages lower by around 40%. Given these conditions, the return of some freedoms quickly led to a wave of strikes, including two general strikes led by Saúl Ubaldini of the CGT labor federation (then the largest in South America). Fanning antagonism on the part of hard-liners in the regime, this led Admiral Jorge Anaya (later court-martialed for gross malfeasance in the 1982 Falklands War) to announce his candidacy for President in August, becoming the first to do so; amid popular jeers of "Anaya canalla" (Anaya the fiend), Bignone immediately thwarted the move.

Amid growing calls for quicker elections, police brutally repressed a December 16, 1982, demonstration in Buenos Aires' central Plaza de Mayo, resulting in the death of one protester and Bignone's hopes for an indefinite postponement of elections. Devoting themselves to damage control, the regime began preparing for the transition by shredding evidence of their murder of 15–30,000 dissidents (most of which were students, academics and labor union personnel uninvolved in the violence Argentina suffered from 1973 to 1976). Hoping to quiet demands that their whereabouts be known, in February 1983 Buenos Aires Police Chief Ramón Camps publicly recognized the crime and asserted that the "disappeared" were, in fact, dead. Provoking popular indignation, Camps' interview forced President Bignone to cease denying the tragedy and, on April 28, declare a blanket amnesty for those involved (including himself).

Among the first prominent political figures to condemn the amnesty was the leader of the UCR's progressive wing, Raúl Alfonsín, who easily secured his party's nomination during their convention in July. Alfonsín chose as his running mate Víctor Martínez, a more conservative UCR figure from Córdoba Province. Their traditional opponents, the Justicialist Party, struggled to find candidates for not only the top of the ticket, but for a number of the more important local races, as well. Following conferences that dragged on for two months after the UCR nominated Alfonsín, the Justicialists' left wing (the target of much of the repression before and after the 1976 coup) proved little match for the CGT's influence within the party.  They nominated ideological opposites Ítalo Lúder, who had served as acting President during Mrs. Perón's September 1975 sick leave, for President and former Chaco Province Governor Deolindo Bittel as his running mate; whereas Lúder had authorized repression against the left in 1975, Bittel was a populist renowned for his defense of Habeas Corpus during the subsequent dictatorship.

Constrained by time, Alfonsín focused his strategy on accusing the Justicialists, who had refused to condemn Bignone's military amnesty, of enjoying the dictator's tacit support.  Alfonsín enjoyed the valuable support of a number of Argentine intellectuals and artists, including playwright Carlos Gorostiza, who devised the UCR candidate's slogan, Ahora, Alfonsín ("Now is the Time for Alfonsín").

Lúder, aware of intraparty tensions, limited his campaign ads and rhetoric largely to an evocation of the founder of the Justicialist Party, the late Juan Perón. Polls gave neither man an edge for the contest, which was scheduled for October 30.  A few days for the elections (which a record turnout), the Justicialist candidate for Governor of Buenos Aires Province, Herminio Iglesias, threw a (premature) "victory rally" in which a coffin draped in the UCR colors was burned before the television cameras.

The bonfire ignited the electorate's bitter memories of Isabel Perón's tenure and helped result in a solid victory for the UCR. The Peronists were given a majority in the Senate and 12 of 22 governorships. The UCR secured only 7 governors, though the nation's largest province, Buenos Aires, would be governed by the UCR's Alejandro Armendáriz. The elections themselves, which allowed Alfonsín to persuade Bignone to advance the inaugural to December 10, 1983, became, in playwright Carlos Gorostiza's words, "more than a democratic way out, a way into life."

Candidates for President 
Radical Civic Union (centrist/social democrat): Former Deputy Raúl Alfonsín of Buenos Aires.
Justicialist Party (populist): Former Senator Ítalo Lúder of Santa Fe.
Intransigent Party (socialist) : Former Governor Oscar Alende of Buenos Aires.
Integration and Development Movement (developmentalist): Economist Rogelio Julio Frigerio of Buenos Aires.

Results 
The Alfonsín-Martínez tandem won the election by 51.75% of votes against the 40.16% of Luder-Bittel tandem. Alfonsín's 51.75% vote percentage would be broken by Cristina Fernández de Kirchner's record of 54.11% vote percentage in 2011.

President

Results by province

Chamber of Deputies

Results by province

Senate

Results by province

Provincial Governors

References

1983
1983 elections in Argentina
Presidency of Raúl Alfonsín
1983